Mifflin Township may refer to:

Ohio 
 Mifflin Township, Ashland County, Ohio
 Mifflin Township, Franklin County, Ohio
 Mifflin Township, Pike County, Ohio
 Mifflin Township, Richland County, Ohio
 Mifflin Township, Wyandot County, Ohio

Pennsylvania 
 Mifflin Township, Columbia County, Pennsylvania
 Mifflin Township, Dauphin County, Pennsylvania
 Mifflin Township, Lycoming County, Pennsylvania

Township name disambiguation pages